Syrrusis pictura is a moth of the family Noctuidae. It is found in Madagascar.

The wingspan of the adult moths is 30 mm.

References

Amphipyrinae
Lepidoptera of Madagascar
Moths described in 1891
Moths of Madagascar
Moths of Africa